Ladánybene is a  village in Bács-Kiskun county, in the Southern Great Plain region of southern Hungary. Few Jews lived in the village until they were murdered in the Holocaust in 1944.

Geography

References

Populated places in Bács-Kiskun County